Axel Lawarée (born 9 October 1973) is a Belgian former professional footballer, who played as a striker, and the current sporting director of Standard Liège.

Management career
In 2010, Lawarée founded a consulting firm which was named Axel Lawarée Consulting SPRL and was located in Oupeye, Belgium. The firm was also working together with the Royal Belgian Football Association.

In November 2014, Lawarée was appointed as a sports advisor and sporting director at Standard Liège, replacing Jean-François De Sart who left his position a few months before. In February 2016, he was assigned a new role as director of the club's youth department. However, on 16 May 2016, Standard announced that the club had decided to end its collaboration with Lawarée.

Two months later, he was appointed sporting director of his former club, RFC Seraing. From January 2014, he got a new role at Seraing as technical director of the club's youth department. Seraing announced on 21 June 2019, that Lawarée would leave the club to start a new chapter with a job at the Royal Belgian Football Association as manager of the national football center of Tubize.

Honours
Rapid Wien
 Austrian Bundesliga: 2004–05

Individual
 Austrian Bundesliga top scorer: 2002–03 (21 goals)

References

External links
 
 

1973 births
Living people
People from Huy
Belgian footballers
Association football forwards
Belgian Pro League players
Segunda División players
Austrian Football Bundesliga players
2. Bundesliga players
3. Liga players
R.F.C. Seraing (1904) players
Standard Liège players
Sevilla FC players
Royal Excel Mouscron players
SW Bregenz players
SK Rapid Wien players
FC Augsburg players
Fortuna Düsseldorf players
Belgian expatriate footballers
Belgian expatriate sportspeople in Spain
Expatriate footballers in Spain
Belgian expatriate sportspeople in Austria
Expatriate footballers in Austria
Belgian expatriate sportspeople in Germany
Expatriate footballers in Germany
Footballers from Liège Province